Satan's School for Girls is a 2000 American made-for-television horror film directed by Christopher Leitch and starring Shannen Doherty, Julie Benz, Daniel Cosgrove and Kate Jackson. It is a remake of a 1973 ABC Movie of the Week of the same name.

Plot
The TV movie is about a woman, Beth Hammersmith, who attends Fallbridge College for Girls under the name Karen Oxford, to find out why her sister, who attended the college, is believed to have committed suicide. Once she is enrolled, she soon discovers a Satanic cult of witches, who call themselves "The Five", who want Beth to join the cult.  The Dean is played by Kate Jackson, who portrayed the character of Roberta Lockhart in the original 1973 film.

Cast

Shannen Doherty as Beth Hammersmith/Karen Oxford
Julie Benz as Alison Kingsley
Daniel Cosgrove as Mark Lantch
Richard Joseph Paul as Nick Delacroix 
Taraji P. Henson as Paige 
Aimée Castle as Courtney 
Mandy Schaffer as Hillary
Victoria Sanchez as Lisa Bagley
Kate Jackson as The Dean
Irene Contogiorgis as Jenny Hammersmith
Alan Fawcett as Ruben
Jessica Goldapple as Kim
Christian Paul as T.J.
Adam MacDonald as Blake
Jonathan Stark as Mr. Hammersmith

Production
The film was directed by Christopher Leitch and is a remake of the 1973 version. The movie was also filmed in the city of Montreal, Quebec and the John Abbott College was used for the movie's campus.

Release
The film first aired on March 13, 2000 on ABC.

References

External links

American horror television films
Remakes of American films
2000 horror films
2000 television films
2000 films
Films about witchcraft
Horror film remakes
Films produced by Aaron Spelling
Films set in schools
Television remakes of films
2000s English-language films
Films directed by Christopher Leitch
2000s American films